Tail risk parity is an extension of the risk parity concept that takes into account the behavior of the portfolio components during tail risk events. The goal of the tail risk parity approach is to protect investment portfolios at the times of economic crises and reduce the cost of such protection during normal market conditions. In the tail risk parity framework risk is defined as expected tail loss. The tail risk parity concept is similar to drawdown parity 

Traditional portfolio diversification relies on the correlations among assets and among asset classes, but these correlations are not constant. Because correlations among assets and asset classes increase during tail risk events and can go to 100%, TRP divides asset classes into buckets that behave differently under market stress conditions, while assets in each bucket behave similarly. During tail risk events asset prices can fall significantly creating deep portfolio drawdowns. Asset classes in each tail risk bucket fall simultaneously during tail risk events and diversification of capital within buckets does not work because periods of negative performance of portfolio components are overlapped. Diversification across tail risk buckets can provide benefits in the form of smaller portfolio drawdowns and reduce the need for tail risk protection.

See also
 Financial risk
 Hedge fund
 Risk parity
 Holy grail distribution
 Black swan theory

References

Financial markets
Investment
Portfolio theories